The Blanc de Termonde is breed of domestic rabbit that originated in Belgium It was developed from Flemish Giant and Beveren stock, originally for commercial meat production.

The Blanc de Termonde is an albino rabbit; therefore, its coat is white and its eyes are pink ("ruby-eyed white"). It weighs .

This breed is currently recognised by the British Rabbit Council (BRC), by whom it is designated as rare. This breed is not currently recognised by the American Rabbit Breeders Association. In Italy, this breed is known as the Bianco di Termonde and is considered rare.

The Blanc de Termonde feeds on fresh leafy greens and veggies.

See also

List of rabbit breeds

References

Rabbit breeds